Melissa Johnson (born 11 August 1991) is an English professional footballer who plays as a forward for FA Women's Championship club Charlton Athletic.

Club career 
Playing for Sheffield FC in the 2017–18 FA WSL 2, Johnson finished as second top-scorer in the league with 12 goals in 15 appearances in the second-tier competition. She was named WSL 2 Player of the Month for January 2018 and again in May 2018.

In August 2018 Johnson joined Leicester City for the 2018–19 season.

In October 2019 she attracted attention after scoring three hat-tricks for Aston Villa in the opening five games of the 2019–20 season earning a nomination for the September FA Women's Championship Player of the Month award. While the season was uncompleted after 14 games due to the COVID-19 pandemic, at the time of the competition's completion Johnson was the second top-scorer with 12 goals.

Johnson returned to Sheffield to represent Sheffield United in August 2020, scoring five goals for the club in 15 league appearances in the 2020–21 season. Johnson announced her departure from Sheffield United in May 2021.

On 10 August 2021, it was announced that Johnson had joined recently relegated Bristol City ahead of the 2021–22 season. She left during the summer in 2022 to join Charlton Athletic.

Career Statistics

References

External links 

 

English women's footballers
1991 births
Living people
Charlton Athletic W.F.C. players
Sheffield F.C. Ladies players
Bristol City W.F.C. players
Leicester City W.F.C. players
Aston Villa W.F.C. players
Sheffield United W.F.C. players
Women's Championship (England) players
Women's association footballers not categorized by position